The women's 200 metres at the 2019 World Para Athletics Championships was held in Dubai from 7–15 November.

Medalists

See also
List of IPC world records in athletics

References

200 metres
2019 in women's athletics
200 metres at the World Para Athletics Championships